Gonzo may refer to:

People
 Gonzo (nickname), a list of people with the nickname
 Radislav Jovanov Gonzo (born 1964), Croatian music video director Radislav Jovanov, also known as Gonzo
 Matthias Röhr (born 1962), German musician whose stage name is Gonzo
 Gonzo Greg (born 1965), American radio host

Arts and entertainment

Characters
 Gonzo (Muppet), a Muppet character
 Gonzo Gates, fictional doctor on television series Trapper John, M.D.
 Gonzo, on the television series Breaking Bad

Music
 Gonzo (album), the fifth studio album by Foxy Shazam
 "Gonzo", a song by the All-American Rejects on their fourth album, Kids in the Street
 "Gonzo", a song by James Booker
 "Gonzo", a song by Ted Nugent on the album Double Live Gonzo!

Other
 Gonzo: The Life and Work of Dr. Hunter S. Thompson, a 2008 documentary
 Gonzo journalism, a style of journalism written without claims of objectivity, often including the reporter as part of the story
 Gonzo (show), a television show with Alexa Chung
 Gonzo (magazine), a Belgian Dutch bi-monthly music magazine first published in 1991
 The Gonzo, the Georgetown University student magazine
 Gonzo pornography, a style of pornography
 In the Shona language from Zimbabwe Gonzo means rat

Other uses
 Gonzo Station, a U.S. Navy acronym for "Gulf of Oman Naval Zone of Operations"
 Gonzo (company), Japanese animation studio
 Gonzo, a configuration of the Bombardier Dash 8 aircraft

See also
 Dr. Gonzo (disambiguation)
 Gonzoe (1975/1976–2021), American rapper